Patrick Robert Kirwan  was an Irish Roman Catholic bishop in the second half of the 18th Century: he was Roman Catholic Bishop of Achonry from 1752 to 1776.

References

1776 deaths
18th-century Roman Catholic bishops in Ireland
Roman Catholic bishops of Achonry